

Events

Pre-1600
 537 – Siege of Rome: The Ostrogoth army under king Vitiges begins the siege of the capital. Belisarius conducts a delaying action outside the Flaminian Gate; he and a detachment of his bucellarii are almost cut off.
 986 – Louis V becomes the last Carolingian king of West Francia after the death of his father, Lothaire.
1331 – Fall of Nicaea to the Ottoman Turks after a siege.
1444 – Skanderbeg organizes a group of Albanian nobles to form the League of Lezhë.
1458 – George of Poděbrady is chosen as the king of Bohemia.
1476 – Burgundian Wars: The Old Swiss Confederacy hands Charles the Bold, Duke of Burgundy, a major defeat in the Battle of Grandson in Canton of Neuchâtel.
1484 – The College of Arms is formally incorporated by Royal Charter signed by King Richard III of England.
1498 – Vasco da Gama's fleet visits the Island of Mozambique.

1601–1900
1657 – The Great Fire of Meireki begins in Edo (now Tokyo), Japan, causing more than 100,000 deaths before it exhausts itself three days later.
1776 – American Revolutionary War: Patriot militia units attempt to prevent capture of supply ships in and around the Savannah River by a small fleet of the Royal Navy in the Battle of the Rice Boats.
1791 – Claude Chappe demonstrates the first semaphore line near Paris.
1797 – The Bank of England issues the first one-pound and two-pound banknotes.
1807 – The U.S. Congress passes the Act Prohibiting Importation of Slaves, disallowing the importation of new slaves into the country.
1811 – Argentine War of Independence: A royalist fleet defeats a small flotilla of revolutionary ships in the Battle of San Nicolás on the River Plate.
1815 – Signing of the Kandyan Convention treaty by British invaders and the leaders of the Kingdom of Kandy.
1836 – Texas Revolution: The Declaration of independence of the Republic of Texas from Mexico is adopted.
1855 – Alexander II becomes Tsar of Russia.
1859 – The two-day Great Slave Auction, the largest such auction in United States history, begins.
1865 – East Cape War: The Völkner Incident in New Zealand.
1867 – The U.S. Congress passes the first Reconstruction Act.
1877 – Just two days before inauguration, the U.S. Congress declares Rutherford B. Hayes the winner of the 1876 U.S. presidential election even though Samuel J. Tilden had won the popular vote.
1882 – Queen Victoria narrowly escapes an assassination attempt by Roderick Maclean in Windsor.

1901–present
1901 – United States Steel Corporation is founded as a result of a merger between Carnegie Steel Company and Federal Steel Company which became the first corporation in the world with a market capital over $1 billion.
  1901   – The U.S. Congress passes the Platt Amendment limiting the autonomy of Cuba, as a condition of the withdrawal of American troops.
1903 – In New York City the Martha Washington Hotel opens, becoming the first hotel exclusively for women.
1917 – The enactment of the Jones–Shafroth Act grants Puerto Ricans United States citizenship.
1919 – The first Communist International meets in Moscow.
1932 – Finnish president P. E. Svinhufvud gives a radio speech, which four days later finally ends the Mäntsälä Rebellion and the far-right Lapua Movement that started it.
1937 – The Steel Workers Organizing Committee signs a collective bargaining agreement with U.S. Steel, leading to unionization of the United States steel industry.
1939 – Cardinal Eugenio Pacelli is elected Pope and takes the name Pius XII.
1941 – World War II: First German military units enter Bulgaria after it joins the Axis Pact.
1943 – World War II: During the Battle of the Bismarck Sea Allied aircraft defeated a Japanese attempt to ship troops to New Guinea.
1949 – Captain James Gallagher lands his B-50 Superfortress Lucky Lady II in Fort Worth, Texas, after completing the first non-stop around-the-world airplane flight in 94 hours and one minute.
1955 – Norodom Sihanouk, king of Cambodia, abdicates the throne in favor of his father, Norodom Suramarit.
1962 – In Burma, the army led by General Ne Win seizes power in a coup d'état.
  1962   – Wilt Chamberlain sets the single-game scoring record in the National Basketball Association by scoring 100 points.
1965 – The US and Republic of Vietnam Air Force begin Operation Rolling Thunder, a sustained bombing campaign against North Vietnam.
1968 – Baggeridge Colliery closes marking the end of over 300 years of coal mining in the Black Country.
1969 – In Toulouse, France, the first test flight of the Anglo-French Concorde is conducted.
1970 – Rhodesia declares itself a republic, breaking its last links with the British crown.
1972 – The Pioneer 10 space probe is launched from Cape Canaveral, Florida with a mission to explore the outer planets.
1977 – Libya becomes the Socialist People's Libyan Arab Jamahiriya as the General People's Congress adopted the "Declaration on the Establishment of the Authority of the People".
1978 – Czech Vladimír Remek becomes the first non-Russian or non-American to go into space, when he is launched aboard Soyuz 28.
  1978   – The late iconic actor Charlie Chaplin's coffin is stolen from his grave in Switzerland.
1983 – Compact discs and players are released for the first time in the United States and other markets. They had previously been available only in Japan.
1989 – Twelve European Community nations agree to ban the production of all chlorofluorocarbons (CFCs) by the end of the century.
1990 – Nelson Mandela is elected deputy president of the African National Congress.
1991 – Establishment of Kuwait Democratic Forum, center-left political organization in Kuwait.
1991 – Battle at Rumaila oil field brings an end to the 1991 Gulf War.
1992 – Start of the war in Transnistria.
  1992   – Armenia, Azerbaijan, Kazakhstan, Kyrgyzstan, Moldova, San Marino, Tajikistan, Turkmenistan and Uzbekistan, all of which (except San Marino) were former Soviet republics, join the United Nations.
1995 – Researchers at Fermilab announce the discovery of the top quark.
1998 – Data sent from the Galileo spacecraft indicates that Jupiter's moon Europa has a liquid ocean under a thick crust of ice.
2002 – U.S. invasion of Afghanistan: Operation Anaconda begins, (ending on March 19 after killing 500 Taliban and al-Qaeda fighters, with 11 Western troop fatalities).
2004 – War in Iraq: Al-Qaeda carries out the Ashoura Massacre in Iraq, killing 170 and wounding over 500.
2012 – A tornado outbreak occurs over a large section of the Southern United States and into the Ohio Valley region, resulting in 40 tornado-related fatalities.
2017 – The elements Moscovium, Tennessine, and Oganesson are officially added to the periodic table at a conference in Moscow, Russia.

Births

Pre-1600
 480 – Benedict of Nursia, Italian Christian saint (d. 543 or 547)
1316 – Robert II of Scotland (d. 1390)
1409 – Jean II, Duke of Alençon (d. 1476)
1432 – Countess Palatine Margaret of Mosbach, countess consort of Hanau (d. 1457)
1453 – Johannes Engel, German doctor, astronomer and astrologer (d. 1512)
1459 – Pope Adrian VI (d. 1523)
1481 – Franz von Sickingen, German knight (d. 1523)
1545 – Thomas Bodley, English diplomat and scholar, founded the Bodleian Library (d. 1613)
1577 – George Sandys, English traveller, colonist and poet (d. 1644)

1601–1900
1628 – Cornelis Speelman, Governor-General of the Dutch East Indies (d. 1684)
1651 – Carlo Gimach, Maltese architect, engineer and poet (d. 1730)
1705 – William Murray, 1st Earl of Mansfield, Scottish lawyer, judge, and politician, Chancellor of the Exchequer (d. 1793)
1740 – Nicholas Pocock, English naval painter (d.1821)
1760 – Camille Desmoulins, French journalist and politician (d. 1794)
1769 – DeWitt Clinton, American lawyer and politician, 6th Governor of New York (d. 1828)
1770 – Louis-Gabriel Suchet, French general (d. 1826)
1779 – Joel Roberts Poinsett, American physician and politician, 15th United States Secretary of War (d. 1851)
1793 – Sam Houston, American soldier and politician, 1st President of the Republic of Texas (d. 1863)
1800 – Yevgeny Baratynsky, Russian-Italian poet and philosopher (d. 1844)
1810 – Pope Leo XIII (d. 1903)
1816 – Alexander Bullock, American lawyer and politician, 26th Governor of Massachusetts (d. 1882)
1817 – János Arany, Hungarian journalist and poet (d. 1882)
1820 – Multatuli, Dutch writer (d. 1887)
1824 – Bedřich Smetana, Czech pianist and composer (d. 1884)
1829 – Carl Schurz, German-American general, lawyer, and politician, 13th United States Secretary of the Interior (d. 1906)
1836 – Henry Billings Brown, American lawyer and judge (d. 1913)
1842 – Carl Jacobsen, Danish brewer, art collector, and philanthropist (d. 1914)
1846 – Marie Roze, French soprano (d. 1926)
1849 – Robert Means Thompson, American commander, lawyer, and businessman (d. 1930)
1859 – Sholem Aleichem, Ukrainian-American author and playwright (d. 1916)
1860 – Susanna M. Salter, American activist and politician (d. 1961)
1862 – John Jay Chapman, American lawyer, author, and poet (d. 1933)
1869 – Julien Félix, French military officer and aviator (d. 1914) 
1876 – James A. Gilmore, American businessman and baseball executive (d. 1947)
  1876   – Pope Pius XII (d. 1958)
1886 – Willis H. O'Brien, American animator and director (d. 1962)
  1886   – Kurt Grelling, German logician and philosopher (d. 1942)
1900 – Kurt Weill, German-American pianist and composer (d. 1950)

1901–present
1901 – Grete Hermann, German mathematician and philosopher (d. 1984)
1902 – Moe Berg, American baseball player and spy (d. 1972)
  1902   – Edward Condon, American physicist and academic (d. 1974)
1904 – Dr. Seuss, American children's book writer, poet, and illustrator (d. 1991)
1905 – Marc Blitzstein, American composer and songwriter (d. 1964)
  1905   – Geoffrey Grigson, English poet and critic (d. 1985)
1908 – Walter Bruch, German engineer (d. 1990)
1909 – Mel Ott, American baseball player, manager, and sportscaster (d. 1958)
1912 – Henry Katzman, American pianist, composer, and painter (d. 2001)
1913 – Godfried Bomans, Dutch television host and author (d. 1971)
  1913   – Mort Cooper, American baseball player (d. 1958)
1914 – Martin Ritt, American actor and film director (d. 1990)
1915 – John Burton, Australian public servant and diplomat, Australian High Commissioner to Ceylon (d. 2010)
1917 – Desi Arnaz, Cuban-American actor, singer, and producer (d. 1986)
  1917   – David Goodis, American author and screenwriter (d. 1967)
  1917   – Jim Konstanty, American baseball player and coach (d. 1976)
1919 – Jennifer Jones, American actress (d. 2009)
  1919   – Eddie Lawrence, American actor, singer, and playwright (d. 2014)
  1919   – Tamara Toumanova, Russian-American ballerina and actress (d. 1996)
1921 – Kazimierz Górski, Polish footballer and coach (d. 2006)
  1921   – Ernst Haas, Austrian-American photographer and journalist (d. 1986)
1922 – Eddie "Lockjaw" Davis, American saxophonist (d. 1986)
  1922   – Bill Quackenbush, Canadian-American ice hockey player and coach (d. 1999)
  1922   – Frances Spence, American computer programmer (d. 2012)
1923 – Basil Hume, English cardinal (d. 1999)
  1923   – Robert H. Michel, American soldier and politician (d. 2017)
  1923   – Dave Strack, American basketball player and coach (d. 2014)
1924 – Cal Abrams, American baseball player (d. 1997)
  1924   – Renos Apostolidis, Greek philologist, author, and critic (d. 2004)
1926 – Bernard Agré, Ivorian cardinal (d. 2014)
  1926   – Murray Rothbard, American economist and historian (d. 1995)
1927 – Roger Walkowiak, French cyclist and economist (d. 2017)
1930 – John Cullum, American actor and singer
  1930   – Emma Penella, Spanish actress (d. 2007)
  1930   – Tom Wolfe, American journalist and author (d. 2018)
1931 – Mikhail Gorbachev, Russian lawyer and politician, the 8th and final leader of the Soviet Union, Nobel Prize laureate (d. 2022)
1932 – Gun Hägglund, Swedish journalist and translator (d. 2011)
1934 – Dottie Rambo, American singer-songwriter (d. 2008)
1935 – Gene Stallings, American football player and coach
1936 – Haroon Ahmed, Pakistani-English engineer and academic
  1936   – John Tusa, Czech-English journalist and academic
1937 – Abdelaziz Bouteflika, Algerian soldier and politician, 5th President of Algeria (d. 2021)
1938 – Ricardo Lagos, Chilean economist, lawyer, and politician, 33rd President of Chile
  1938   – Lawrence Payton, American singer-songwriter and producer (d. 1997)
  1938   – Clark Gesner, American author and composer (d. 2002)
1939 – Jan Howard Finder, American author and academic (d. 2013)
1940 – Billy McNeill, Scottish footballer (d. 2019)
1941 – John Cornell, Australian actor, director, and producer
  1941   – David Satcher, American admiral and physician, 16th Surgeon General of the United States
1942 – John Irving, American novelist and screenwriter
  1942   – Claude Larose, Canadian ice hockey player and coach
  1942   – Mir-Hossein Mousavi, Iranian architect and politician, 79th Prime Minister of Iran
  1942   – Lou Reed, American singer-songwriter, guitarist, producer, and actor (d. 2013)
  1942   – Derek Woodley, English footballer (d. 2002)
1943 – George Layton, English actor, director, and screenwriter
  1943   – Peter Straub, American author and poet (d. 2022)
  1943   – Robert Williams, American painter and cartoonist
1945 – Derek Watkins, English trumpet player and composer (d. 2013)
1947 – Nelson Ned, Brazilian singer-songwriter (d. 2014)
  1947   – Harry Redknapp, English footballer and manager
1948 – Larry Carlton, American guitarist and songwriter
  1948   – Rory Gallagher, Irish singer-songwriter, guitarist, and producer (d. 1995)
  1948   – Jeff Kennett, Australian journalist and politician, 43rd Premier of Victoria
  1948   – Carmen Lawrence, Australian politician, 25th Premier of Western Australia
1950 – Karen Carpenter, American singer (d. 1983)
1952 – Mark Evanier, American author and screenwriter
  1952   – Laraine Newman, American actress and comedian
1953 – Russ Feingold, American lawyer and politician
1954 – Ed Johnstone, Canadian ice hockey player and coach
1955 – Dale Bozzio, American pop-rock singer-songwriter
  1955   – Jay Osmond, American singer, drummer, actor, and TV/film producer
  1955   – Ken Salazar, American lawyer and politician, 50th United States Secretary of the Interior
  1955   – Steve Small, Australian cricketer
1956 – John Cowsill, American musician, songwriter, and producer 
  1956   – Mark Evans, Australian rock bass player
1957 – Hossein Dehghan, Iranian general and politician, Iranian Minister of Defense
  1957   – Dito Tsintsadze, Georgian film director and screenwriter
  1957   – Mark Dean, American inventor and computer engineer
1958 – Kevin Curren, South African-American tennis player
  1958   – Ian Woosnam, English-Welsh golfer
1959 – Larry Stewart, American singer-songwriter and guitarist 
1961 – Simone Young, Australian conductor, director, and composer
1962 – Jon Bon Jovi, American singer-songwriter, guitarist, producer, and actor 
  1962   – Paul Farrelly, English journalist and politician
  1962   – Tom Nordlie, Norwegian footballer and coach
  1962   – Brendan O'Connor, Australian politician, Australian Minister for Employment
  1962   – Raimo Summanen, Finnish ice hockey player and coach
  1962   – Gabriele Tarquini, Italian race car driver
1963 – Alvin Youngblood Hart, American singer and guitarist
  1963   – Anthony Albanese, Australian politician, 31st Prime Minister of Australia
1964 – Laird Hamilton, American surfer and actor
  1964   – Mike Von Erich, American wrestler (d. 1987)
1965 – Ron Gant, American baseball player and journalist
  1965   – Lembit Öpik, Northern Irish politician
1966 – Ann Leckie, American author 
  1966   – Simon Reevell, English lawyer and politician
1968 – Daniel Craig, English actor and producer
1970 – James Purnell, English politician, Secretary of State for Work and Pensions
  1970   – Ciriaco Sforza, Swiss footballer and manager
  1970   – Wibi Soerjadi, Dutch pianist and composer
1971 – Dave Gorman, English comedian, author and television presenter
  1971   – Method Man, American rapper, record producer and actor 
1972 – Mauricio Pochettino, Argentinian footballer and manager
1973 – Dejan Bodiroga, Serbian basketball player
  1973   – Trevor Sinclair, English footballer and manager
1974 – Hayley Lewis, Australian swimmer and television host
1975 – Daryl Gibson, New Zealand rugby player
1977 – Dominique Canty, American basketball player and coach
  1977   – Chris Martin, English singer-songwriter and producer 
  1977   – Stephen Parry, English swimmer and sportscaster
  1977   – Andrew Strauss, South African-English cricketer
1978 – Gabby Eigenmann, Filipino actor and singer
  1978   – Lee Hodges, English footballer and manager
  1978   – Sebastian Janikowski, Polish gridiron football player
  1978   – Tomáš Kaberle, Czech ice hockey player
1979 – Damien Duff, Irish international footballer
  1979   – Jim Troughton, English cricketer
  1979   – Nicky Weaver, English footballer
1980 – Chris Barker, English footballer and manager (d. 2020)
  1980   – Rebel Wilson, Australian actress and screenwriter
1981 – Lance Cade, American wrestler (d. 2010)
  1981   – Bryce Dallas Howard, American actress 
1982 – Kevin Kurányi, German footballer
  1982   – Henrik Lundqvist, Swedish ice hockey player
  1982   – Ben Roethlisberger, American football player
  1982   – Corey Webster, American football player
1983 – Deuce, American singer-songwriter and producer 
  1983   – Lisandro López, Argentinian footballer
  1983   – Jay McClement, Canadian ice hockey player
  1983   – Glen Perkins, American baseball player
  1983   – Ryan Shannon, American ice hockey player
1985 – Reggie Bush, American football player
  1985   – Suso Santana, Spanish footballer
1986 – Jonathan D'Aversa, Canadian ice hockey player
1987 – Jonas Jerebko, Swedish basketball player
1988 – Édgar Andrade, Mexican footballer
  1988   – James Arthur, English singer-songwriter
  1988   – Laura Kaeppeler, Miss America 2012
  1988   – Matthew Mitcham, Australian diver
  1988   – Chris Rainey, American football player
  1988   – Geert Arend Roorda, Dutch footballer
1989 – Alemão, Brazilian footballer
  1989   – Toby Alderweireld, Belgian international footballer
  1989   – Nathalie Emmanuel, English actress
  1989   – Marcel Hirscher, Austrian skier
  1989   – André Bernardes Santos, Portuguese footballer
  1989   – Shane Vereen, American football player
  1989   – Chris Woakes, English cricketer
1990 – Rauno Alliku, Estonian footballer
  1990   – Malcolm Butler, American football player
  1990   – Luke Combs, American singer-songwriter
  1990   – Josh McGuire, Australian rugby league player
  1990   – Tiger Shroff, Indian actor
1991 – Nick Franklin, American baseball player
1992 – Jack Stockwell, Australian rugby league player
1995 – Ange-Freddy Plumain, French footballer
1997 – Becky G, American singer and actress
1998 – Tua Tagovailoa, American football player
2010 – Hailey Dawson, American with a 3D-printed robotic hand
2016 – Prince Oscar, duke of Skåne and prince of Sweden

Deaths

Pre-1600
 274 – Mani, Persian prophet and founder of Manichaeism (b. 216)
 672 – Chad of Mercia, English bishop and saint (b. 634)
 986 – Lothair, king of West Francia (b.941)
 968 – William, archbishop of Mainz (b. 929)
1009 – Mokjong, king of Goryeo (b. 980)
1127 – Charles the Good, Count of Flanders (b. 1084)
1316 – Marjorie Bruce, Scottish daughter of Robert the Bruce (b. 1296)
1333 – Wladyslaw I, king of Poland (b. 1261)
1589 – Alessandro Farnese, Italian cardinal and diplomat (b. 1520)

1601–1900
1619 – Anne of Denmark, queen of Scotland (b. 1574)
1729 – Francesco Bianchini, Italian astronomer and philosopher (b. 1662)
1755 – Louis de Rouvroy, French duke and diplomat (b. 1675)
1791 – John Wesley, English cleric and theologian (b. 1703)
1793 – Carl Gustaf Pilo, Swedish-Danish painter and academic (b. 1711)
1797 – Horace Walpole, English historian and politician (b. 1717)
1829 – Josefa Ortiz de Domínguez, Mexican revolutionary (b. ca. 1773)
1830 – Samuel Thomas von Sömmerring, German physician, anatomist, and anthropologist (b. 1755)
1835 – Francis II, Holy Roman Emperor (b. 1768)
1840 – Heinrich Wilhelm Matthias Olbers, German physician and astronomer (b. 1758)
1855 – Nicholas I, Russian emperor (b. 1796)
1864 – Ulric Dahlgren, American colonel (b. 1842)
1865 – Carl Sylvius Völkner, German-New Zealand priest and missionary (b. 1819)
1880 – John Benjamin Macneill, Irish engineer (b. 1790)
1895 – Berthe Morisot, French painter (b. 1841)
  1895   – Isma'il Pasha, Egyptian politician (b. 1830)
1896 – Jubal Early, American general (b. 1816)

1901–present
1921 – Champ Clark, American lawyer and politician, 41st Speaker of the United States House of Representatives (b. 1850)
1930 – D. H. Lawrence, English novelist, poet, playwright, and critic (b. 1885)
1938 – Ben Harney, American pianist and composer (b. 1871)
1939 – Howard Carter, English archaeologist and historian (b. 1874)
1943 – Gisela Januszewska, Austrian physician (b.1867)
1944 – Ida Maclean, British biochemist, the first woman admitted to the London Chemical Society (b. 1877)
1945 – Emily Carr, Canadian painter and author (b. 1871)
1946 – Fidél Pálffy, Hungarian politician, Hungarian Minister of Agriculture (b. 1895)
  1946   – George E. Stewart, American colonel, Medal of Honor recipient (b. 1872)
1947 – Frans Johan Louwrens Ghijsels, Dutch architect and urban planner (b. 1882)
1949 – Sarojini Naidu, Indian poet and activist (b. 1879)
1953 – James Lightbody, American runner (b. 1882)
1957 – Selim Sırrı Tarcan, Turkish educator and politician (b. 1874)
1958 – Fred Merkle, American baseball player and manager (b. 1888)
1962 – Charles Jean de la Vallée-Poussin, Belgian mathematician and academic (b. 1866)
1967 – José Martínez Ruiz, Spanish author and critic (b. 1873)
1972 – Léo-Ernest Ouimet, Canadian director and producer (b. 1877)
1977 – Eugénie Brazier, French chef (b. 1895)
1979 – Christy Ring, Irish hurler (b. 1920)
1982 – Philip K. Dick, American philosopher and author (b. 1928)
1987 – Randolph Scott, American actor and director (b. 1898)
  1987   – Lolo Soetoro, Indonesian geographer and academic (b. 1935)
1991 – Serge Gainsbourg, French singer-songwriter, actor, and director (b. 1928)
1992 – Sandy Dennis, American actress (b. 1937)
1994 – Anita Morris, American actress, singer, and dancer (b. 1943)
1999 – Dusty Springfield, English singer (b. 1939)
2000 – Sandra Schmirler, Canadian curler (b. 1963)
2003 – Hank Ballard, American singer-songwriter (b. 1927)
  2003   – Malcolm Williamson, Australian pianist and composer (b. 1931)
2004 – Cormac McAnallen, Irish footballer (b. 1980)
  2004   – Mercedes McCambridge, American actress (b. 1916)
  2004   – Marge Schott, American businesswoman (b. 1928)
2005 – Martin Denny, American pianist and composer (b. 1911)
2007 – Thomas S. Kleppe, American soldier and politician, 41st United States Secretary of the Interior (b. 1919)
  2007   – Clem Labine, American baseball player (b. 1926)
  2007   – Ivan Safronov, Russian colonel and journalist (b. 1956)
  2007   – Henri Troyat, Russian-French historian and author (b. 1911)
2008 – Jeff Healey, Canadian singer-songwriter and guitarist (b. 1966)
2009 – João Bernardo Vieira, Bissau-Guinean politician, President of Guinea-Bissau (b. 1939)
2010 – Winston Churchill, English journalist and politician (b. 1940)
2012 – Lawrence Anthony, South African environmentalist, explorer, and author (b. 1950)
  2012   – Van T. Barfoot, American colonel, Medal of Honor recipient (b. 1919)
  2012   – Norman St John-Stevas, English academic and politician, Chancellor of the Duchy of Lancaster (b. 1929)
  2012   – James Q. Wilson, American political scientist and academic (b. 1931)
2013 – Peter Harvey, Australian journalist (b. 1944)
  2013   – Giorgos Kolokithas, Greek basketball player (b. 1945)
  2013   – Shabnam Shakeel, Pakistani poet and author (b. 1942)
2014 – Ryhor Baradulin, Belarusian poet and translator (b. 1935)
2015 – Dean Hess, American minister and colonel (b. 1917)
  2015   – Dave Mackay, Scottish-English footballer and manager (b. 1934)
  2015   – Mal Peet, English author and illustrator (b. 1947)
2016 – Benoît Lacroix, Canadian priest, historian, and philosopher (b. 1915)
  2016   – Aubrey McClendon, American businessman (b. 1959)
2018 – Billy Herrington, American actor (b. 1969)
  2018   – Lin Hu, Chinese lieutenant general (b. 1927)
2019 – Mike Oliver, British sociologist, disability rights activist (b. 1945)

Holidays and observances
Air Force Day (Sri Lanka)
Baloch Culture Day (Balochistan)
Christian feast day:
Agnes of Bohemia
Angela of the Cross
Blessed Charles the Good, Count of Flanders
Chad of Mercia (Catholic Church, Anglican Communion, Eastern Orthodox Church)
John Maron 
March 2 (Eastern Orthodox liturgics)
Feast of 'Alá (Loftiness), First day of the 19th month of the Baháʼí calendar (Baháʼí Faith) and first day of the Baháʼí Nineteen Day Fast
Jamahiriya Day (Libya)
National Read Across America Day (United States)
Peasants' Day (Myanmar)
Texas Independence Day
Adwa Victory Day (Ethiopia)

References

External links

 BBC: On This Day
 
 Historical Events on March 2

Days of the year
March